The Democrats (D), previously known as the Blue Coalition (MK), is a Slovak political party founded in 2023 by former Prime Minister Mikuláš Dzurinda on the legal base of the SPOLU party.
It is led by prime minister Eduard Heger since 7 March 2023.

Ideology 
Loyalty to Western civilization, membership in the European Union and NATO, protection of democracy and the rule of law, and a sustainable and competitive economy are the three pillars that must be accepted by parties and politicians who would like to join the Blue Coalition. Dzurinda criticizes modern political culture in parliament and the "cultural wars" of liberals with conservatives. Dzurinda called to unite them.

History 

Earlier, Dzurinda had already planned to create his own liberal-conservative political force "The Blues – European People's Party", but the announcement of early elections changed his plans.

On 27 January 2023, after the announcement of a snap election, Dzurinda presented the Blue Coalition, thereby returning to Slovak politics after leaving it 10 years ago. At a press conference, Dzurinda presented his project, with which he wants to fight "for a European Slovakia", wants to be "a reasonable alternative to the mafia and chaos" and "for a modern and educated Slovakia". He called the Blue Coalition his new political home. Dzurinda's press conference was attended by former members of the SDKÚ-DS and leader of the SPOLU party Miroslav Kollár. Both the leader of ODS and the leader of Democrats of Slovakia, minor centre-right parties which cooperated with SPOLU, announced their support for the Blue Coalition.

It is currently led by Prime Minister of Slovakia Eduard Heger. Dzurinda left the project soon after.

Criticism 
The leader of the Christian Democratic Movement criticized Dzurinda's "dream" of uniting the KDH, SaS and PS in the elections, saying that the "non-aggression pact" with the Progressives in the last elections brought damage to the party.

Notes

References 

Liberal conservative parties in Slovakia
Political parties established in 2023
Pro-European political parties in Slovakia
European political people
European Union